The ECI Prize is a prize awarded annually from 1986 onwards to an ecologist distinguished by outstanding and sustained scientific achievements. It is awarded jointly by the International Ecology Institute, a non-profit organization of research ecologists based in Germany dedicated to fostering ecological knowledge and awareness, and the Otto Kinne Foundation. 

The prize both honors the recipient and requires him or her to serve science and society by authoring a book to be  published in the series 'Excellence in Ecology', published by Inter-Research and available at cost price. The ECI Prize carries an endowment of € 6,000 and is awarded alternatively for terrestrial ecology, marine ecology and limnetic ecology.

ECI Prize Laureates
Source: Ecology Institute
1986 Tom Fenchel , marine ecology
1987 Edward O. Wilson , terrestrial ecology
1988 Gene Likens , limnetic ecology
1989 Robert T. Paine , marine ecology
1990 Harold A. Mooney , terrestrial ecology
1991 Robert H. Peters , limnetic ecology
1992 David H. Cushing , marine ecology
1993 Paul R. Ehrlich , terrestrial ecology
1994 Colin S. Reynolds , limnetic ecology
1995 Ramon Margalef , marine ecology
1996 John Lawton , terrestrial ecology
1997 Maciej Gliwicz , limnetic ecology
1998 Richard T. Barber , marine ecology
1999 Ilkka Hanski , terrestrial ecology
2000 Stephen R. Carpenter , limnetic ecology
2001 Louis Legendre , marine ecology
2002 Michel Loreau , terrestrial ecology
2003 Jonathan J. Cole , limnetic ecology
2004 Bo Barker Jørgensen , marine ecology
2005 Robert D. Holt , terrestrial ecology
2006 Winfried Lampert , limnetic ecology
2007 Daniel Pauly , marine ecology
2008 Monica Turner , terrestrial ecology
2009 Brian Moss , limnetic ecology
2010 Paul Falkowski , marine ecology
2011 Georgina Mace , terrestrial ecology
2012 Alan Hildrew , limnetic ecology
2013 Antje Boetius , marine ecology
2014 William H. Schlesinger , terrestrial ecology
2015 John Smol , limnetic ecology
2016 Jane Lubchenco , marine ecology
2017 Kevin Gaston , terrestrial ecology
2018 Lars Tranvik , freshwater ecology
2019 Nils Christian Stenseth , marine ecology

See also

 List of ecology awards
 List of environmental awards

External links
ECI Prize website

Awards established in 1986
Ecology awards